Pinto is an unincorporated community along the North Branch Potomac River in Allegany County, Maryland, United States across from Rocket Center, West Virginia. While the town is officially named Potomac, its post office is referred to as Pinto because there already exists a Potomac, Maryland. Pinto is located south of Cresaptown on Winchester Road.

Pinto once had a sizable apple orchard industry.

References

Unincorporated communities in Allegany County, Maryland
Unincorporated communities in Maryland
Populated places in the Cumberland, MD-WV MSA
Cumberland, MD-WV MSA
Populated places on the North Branch Potomac River